John Macdonald (born August 30, 1978) is a former professional Canadian football defensive linemen. He was drafted by the Hamilton Tiger-Cats in the first round of the 2002 CFL Draft. He played college football at McGill University.  John was raised in Simcoe, Ontario and is a Mohawk from Six Nations of the Grand River, Ontario.

John is currently a teacher for the Grand Erie District School Board.  He is married with two children and lives in Brantford, Ontario.

External links
Profile Tiger Cats Alumni Website
McGill football star John Macdonald signs 3-year pact with Hamilton Tiger Cats

1978 births
Living people
Canadian football defensive linemen
Canadian Mohawk people
Hamilton Tiger-Cats players
McGill Redbirds football players
McGill University alumni
Players of Canadian football from Ontario
Sportspeople from Hamilton, Ontario